Uttamaujas and Yudhamanyu are two brothers from the Panchala kingdom featured in the Hindu epic Mahabharata. In some versions of the epic, they were the sons of Panchala king Drupada and thus the brothers of Draupadi. During the Kurukshetra War, they became the bodyguards of Arjuna and fought a battle against Duryodhana.

Legend 

The names of Uttamaujas and his brother Yudhamanyu are mentioned in the Mahabharata. They are was the incarnations of the adityas named Amshuman and Aryaman.

Once, Uttamaujas and his brother Yudhamanyu while Duryodhana was giving a list of twenty great and important charioteers (Maharathis) that were taking part in the war on behalf of the Pandavas According to the Mahabharata, they were brothers and princes from the royal clan of the Panchalas. The name of the king of Southern Panchala, at that time, was Drupada. Their role and duties are mentioned at various places in the Mahabharata. Both were engaged as body guards of Arjuna initially. Yudhamanyu was deployed as the protector of the left wheel of the chariot of Arjuna, while Uttamaujas was posted as the protector of the right wheel.  Later they were asked to protect the chariot at the rear.

On their way to meet Arjuna, they were stopped by King Duryodhana and engaged in a fierce battle.

Battle 

At the time of the Chakravyuha (formation like a wheel), the two Panchala brothers wanted to meet Arjuna who was away from the battlefield and apprise him of the grave situation. As they could not pierce the Chakravyuha, they tried to bypass the Kuru army. Duryodhana observed them and engaged them in battle. The brothers attacked Duryodhana with twenty arrows, and his horses with four more. Duryodhana demolished Yudhamanyu's standard with a single arrow, his bow with another arrow and finally felled Yudhamanyu's charioteer with a wedge headed arrow, stunning but not killing him. Uttamaujas killed Duryodhana's charioteer with gold embellished arrows. In retaliation, Duryodhana killed the four horses of Uttamaujas' chariot and also killed his two charioteers. Uttamaujas jumped from his now useless chariot and clambered into his brother's chariot. Seeing that Duryodhana was marching towards them with his gada (mace), both the brothers jumped out of their chariot and drove away in two other chariots to meet Arjuna. During the Kurukshetra war, Uttamaujas fought many great warriors of the enemy camp such as Drona, Ashwatthama, Kritavarma, Duryodhana, Karna, and Kripa.
 
They accompanied the Pandavas when they went in search of Duryodhana who was hiding in a lake. They were brutally murdered by Ashwatthama at midnight after the war ended on the eighteenth day, while they were sleeping in the Pandava camp. Yudhisthira cremated them along with the dead warriors of both the camps.

References

 Commentary on Bhagavad Gita by Sri Jayadayal Goyandaka, Srimad Bhavat Gita Tatva vivechan (Telugu and Hindi),Gita Press, Gorakhpur, Third Edition, 2001.
 Press-com/2010/08/04 The Complete Mahabharata, Volume 6, Drona Parva, By Sri S.B.Pillay (2014)

Characters in the Mahabharata
Characters in Hindu mythology